Youssef Alimam (born 8 February 1991) is a freelance Egyptian filmmaker, musician, and model.

Early life
He has been educated in both Egypt and Canada, and speaks both Arabic and English. Originally from, Cairo, Egypt, Alimam currently splits his time between Cairo, Egypt and Quebec, Canada.

Past Projects
Alimam has gained notoriety in recent months for his controversial short film, Libido. Libido follows the life of Mazen, a young Egyptian trying to deal with his sexuality, something that is very taboo in Egypt.

He created the film as a final graduation project at the High Cinema Institute in Cairo, Egypt. When interviewed about Libido by Global Voices Online, Alimam said, "I was thinking I wanted to talk about the subject because I myself thought about this a lot as a kid. I did not receive proper sex education in my school, and my curiosity was just like any other kid, so I thought it would be very interesting to finally ask the questions myself for the first time when I was 20. Then, I started researching, until I finally came up with the whole concept of the movie, and how it shall be made."

Alimam released the film over the internet, reaching people far and wide. By doing so, young people across not only the Middle East, but everywhere could watch and relate to something natural, yet discouraged.

Since releasing Libido, Alimam has created a second short film entitled, Speed of Light. It is an 8-minute sci-fi film which Alimam describes as, "very different from Libido." Speed of Light was selected in six different official festivals, premiering at the Dubai Film Festival. Next, it will be screened at the LA Shorts Fest.

Current Project
Alimam studied sound engineering at Recording Arts Canada, and is now recording his first album, which he plans to release on YouTube under the name MAYET NAR. In English, the album is called "Sulphuric acid." The title is a metaphor about emotional destruction and when translated according to the artist, it references "water on fire". Alimam produces vocals, samplings, bass, guitars, and drums. Monir Mazhar, another band member, plays piano and also sings.

References

External links 
Facebook
Twitter
Video: Libido 
Interview with Alimam

1991 births
Living people
Egyptian male models
Musicians from Cairo
Egyptian film directors
Film people from Cairo